Selenotholus is a monotypic genus of  tarantulas containing the single species, Selenotholus foelschei. It was first described by Henry Roughton Hogg in 1902, and is found in the Northern Territory. It is distinguished from Selenocosmia in by a thoracic fovea recurved, along with the first and fourth pairs of legs being of equal size. 

S. foelschei was named after its collecter, Paul Foelsche.

See also
 List of Theraphosidae species

References

Monotypic Theraphosidae genera
Spiders of Australia
Theraphosidae